Bettina Kupfer (born 19 July 1963) is a German actress and author who has been active since the 1980s. She and her husband, write screenplays and children's literature.

Career
Kupfer was born in Stuttgart. After acquiring her Abitur at the Ernst-Sigle-Gymnasium in Kornwestheim, Kupfer studied the English and German languages and philosophy at the State University of Music and Performing Arts Stuttgart. She graduated with a degree in drama, and then found successive employment at the Staatstheater Stuttgart, Staatstheater Nürnberg, Düsseldorfer Schauspielhaus, and Theater Basel. Kupfer got her breakthrough by playing Regina Perlman in the 1993 film Schindler's List. Two years later, she was awarded the 1996 Bavarian TV Award for Best Actress for her role in the 1995 television movie Das Wunschkind.

Kupfer was the lead actress in the German television series Drei mit Herz and had previously appeared in guest roles on shows like Wolffs Revier and Ein Fall für zwei. From 1996 to 1997, she played the secretary Daniela Holm in Girl friends – Freundschaft mit Herz.

Education
In 2013, Kupfer received a master's degree in psychology from the International Psychoanalytic University Berlin.

Citations

External links
 "Bettina Kupfer", IMDb
 "Bettina Kupfer", filmportal.de 
 Literature by and about Bettina Kupfer in the catalog of the German National Library

1963 births
Living people
Actresses from Stuttgart
German film actresses
German stage actresses
German screenwriters
State University of Music and Performing Arts Stuttgart alumni
International Psychoanalytic University Berlin alumni